Romulus Bucuroiu (born 1 January 1956) is a Romanian gymnast. He competed in eight events at the 1980 Summer Olympics.

References

1956 births
Living people
Romanian male artistic gymnasts
Olympic gymnasts of Romania
Gymnasts at the 1980 Summer Olympics
People from Buzău County